"This Means War" is the third single from the Canadian rock band Nickelback's seventh studio album, Here and Now. It was initially released as a promotional single in Germany on November 10, 2011, and was later released as a radio single in the United States on February 14, 2012. On February 16, 2012, a behind-the-scenes video is posted on nickelbacktv on YouTube. A music video was shot for the single, it premiered on March 29, 2012. It was also used as the official theme song for WWE's Elimination Chamber (2012).

Track listing
 This Means War (Album Version)
 This Means War (Rock Version)

Charts

Weekly charts

Year-end charts

References

2011 songs
2012 singles
Nickelback songs
Songs written by Chad Kroeger
Roadrunner Records singles